Sir Hughe Montgomery Knatchbull-Hugessen  (26 March 1886 – 21 March 1971) was a British diplomat, civil servant and author. He is best remembered as the diplomat whose secrets were stolen by his Kosovar Albanian valet and passed on to Nazi Germany.

Background and education
He was the second son of Reverend Reginald Bridges Knatchbull-Hugessen, son of Sir Edward Knatchbull, 9th Baronet, and his second wife Rachel Mary, daughter of Admiral Sir Alexander Montgomery, 3rd Baronet. At school, he was known as "Snatch"; the nickname stuck to him for the rest of his life. Knatchbull-Hugessen was educated at Eton College and then at Balliol College, Oxford, where he befriended Anthony Eden and graduated BA in 1907. A year later, he joined the Foreign Office.

Career

He soon obtained the chance of the paid post of an attaché and in October 1909 he went to Constantinople. Returned to England, he served in the contraband department during the First World War and after its end in 1918, when the Foreign Service and the Diplomatic Service merged, Knatchbull-Hugessen became eligible for other postings. Promoted to first secretary, he was attached to the British Delegation at the Versailles Conference in January 1919, for which he was appointed Companion of the Order of St Michael and St George (CMG) in the 1920 New Year Honours.
After a posting in The Hague, followed by Paris, he became counsellor at the country's embassy in Brussels in 1926, an office he held until 1930. In 1931 Knatchbull-Hugessen was appointed Envoy Extraordinary and Minister Plenipotentiary to the Republics of Estonia, Lithuania, and Latvia until 1934; he was stationed at Riga, Latvia. Then he transferred to Tehran as Envoy Extraordinary and Minister Plenipotentiary to Persia. He was appointed Knight Commander of the Order of St Michael and St George (KCMG) in the 1936 New Year Honours and was sent to China as Ambassador Extraordinary and Plenipotentiary.

In the summer of 1937, while travelling between Nanking and Shanghai in an embassy car, Knatchbull-Hugessen and his companions were machine-gunned by a Japanese fighter aircraft; he was the only one hit. After a two-hour drive to the nearest hospital he received emergency surgery. He was first hospitalised in Shanghai and then invalided home to Britain. A bullet had passed clean through him while another narrowly missed his spine; he narrowly escaped paralysis. The incident, widely reported by newspapers worldwide, was a major diplomatic incident. Having taken over a year to recover from his wound, Knatchbull-Hugessen was appointed Ambassador Extraordinary and Plenipotentiary to the Turkish Republic in 1939.

During his time in Ankara, he competed for influence against the German ambassador Franz von Papen. 
From December 1942, Knatchbull-Hugessen was ordered to begin putting pressure to get Turkey into the Allied fold. Churchill suggested a meeting with the Turkish president İsmet İnönü and a conference was organised in Adana, held on a disused railway, in the Turkish presidential train.

In 1943, Knatchbull-Hugessen oversaw secret talks with diplomats from the Hungarian Embassy who wanted to sign an armistice with Britain. On 9 September 1943, aboard a yacht in the Sea of Marmara, Knatchbull-Hugessen concluded a preliminary armistice agreement with László Veress,  an official of the Hungarian Ministry of Foreign Affairs. Under the preliminary armistice terms Hungarian forces would surrender to British and American forces the moment they arrived in Hungary. The agreement was never put into effect because Hungary's borders were reached by Soviet troops first.

From November 1943 to March 1944, his Kosovar Albanian chauffeur and valet, Elyesa Bazna, known under the cover name Cicero, regularly opened his mail and safe, selling any useful information to German High Command; one of the more damaging spying incidents of World War II. Sir John Dashwood, the Foreign Office's security officer, would explain later how the valet took papers from Knatchbull-Hugessen's secret boxes "in the morning, when the ambassador was in the bathroom, and in the early afternoon when the ambassador went into the town to play the piano".

Knatchbull-Hugessen's career somehow survived the scandal, in 1944, he became Ambassador Extraordinary and Plenipotentiary to Belgium and additionally Envoy Extraordinary and Minister Plenipotentiary to Luxembourg, he retired three years later in 1947 to his home near Canterbury.

Family
On 16 July 1912, he married Mary Gordon-Gilmour (1890–1978), daughter of Brigadier-General Sir Robert Gilmour, 1st Baronet. They had three children: a son and two daughters:

 Norton Reginald Knatchbull-Hugessen (14 Apr 1913-26 Mar 1941)
 Elisabeth Knatchbull-Hugessen (17 Mar 1915-15 Aug 1957), married 1939 her father's private secretary, Sir George Peregrine Young, who had saved her life during the 1937 shooting. Their children include the Conservative politician, Sir George Young.
 Alethea Knatchbull-Hugessen (15 Mar 1918-24 Mar 2011)

Works
Diplomat in Peace and War (1949)
Kentish Family (1960)

Popular culture
5 Fingers: A film based on the book written by the diplomatic attaché of Nazi Germany at the time, directed by Joseph L. Mankiewicz in 1952. Hughe Knatchbull-Hugessen was renamed Sir Frederic Taylor and played by Walter Hampden.	
Operation Cicero: A Turkish film released in 2019, Tamer Levent plays Hughe Knatchbull-Hugessen.

Footnotes

References

External links
 
The Papers of Sir Hughe Knatchbull-Hugessen held at Churchill Archives Centre

1886 births
1971 deaths
Alumni of Balliol College, Oxford
Ambassadors of the United Kingdom to China
Ambassadors of the United Kingdom to Turkey
Ambassadors of the United Kingdom to Luxembourg
Ambassadors of the United Kingdom to Belgium
Ambassadors of the United Kingdom to Iran
Ambassadors of the United Kingdom to Estonia
Ambassadors of the United Kingdom to Lithuania
Ambassadors of the United Kingdom to Latvia
Knights Commander of the Order of St Michael and St George
People educated at Eton College
Members of HM Diplomatic Service
Members of HM Foreign Service
20th-century British diplomats
Hughe